Diplomys is a genus of rodent in the family Echimyidae.
They are found in Costa Rica, Ecuador, Colombia and Panama.

Systematics
The genus contains the following species:
 Colombian soft-furred spiny rat (Diplomys caniceps)
 Rufous soft-furred spiny rat (Diplomys labilis)

Phylogeny
Diplomys is a member of the Echimyini clade of arboreal Echimyidae rodents. The closest relative of Diplomys is Santamartamys, reflecting the fact that these taxa have once been classified in the same genus. These two genera constitute the sister group of the "Dactylomyines", a clade of South American bamboo rats. All these taxa are closely related to the genera Echimys, Phyllomys, Makalata, Pattonomys, and Toromys. In turn, these genera share phylogenetic affinities with the clade containing Lonchothrix and Mesomys, and with Isothrix.

References

 
Rodent genera
Taxa named by Oldfield Thomas
Taxonomy articles created by Polbot